Lapadas do Povo is the fourth album of the Brazilian band Raimundos. It was launched in 1997, and produced by Mark Dearnley, at Sound City Studio, in Los Angeles. Reviewers of the album found it to be pleasantly heavier than the band's previous offerings, but that came at the cost of the removal of some of their prior local Northeastern Brazilian flavor.

Track listing
"Andar na Pedra" (Walking on the rock)
"Véio, Manco E Gordo" (Old, lame and fat)
"O Toco" (The piece of wood)
"Poquito Más (Healthy Food)" (A little more (Healthy Food))
"Wipe Out"
"CC De Com Força"
"Crumis Ódamis"
"Bonita" (Pretty)
"Ui, Ui, Ui"
"Oliver’s Army (Elvis Costello cover)"
"Pequena Raimunda (Ramones parody)"
"Baile Funky"
"Bass Hell (Bônus Crap)"

Personnel
 Digão - lead guitar, vocals
 Rodolfo Abrantes - lead vocals, rhythm guitar
 Canisso - bass guitar
 Fred Castro - drums

References

1997 albums
Raimundos albums
Albums recorded at Sound City Studios